The capuchin babbler (Turdoides atripennis) is a species of bird in the family Leiothrichidae.

It is found in Benin, Cameroon, Central African Republic, Democratic Republic of the Congo, Ivory Coast, Gambia, Ghana, Guinea, Guinea-Bissau, Liberia, Mali, Nigeria, Senegal, Sierra Leone, Togo, and Uganda. Its natural habitat is subtropical or tropical moist lowland forest.

The capuchin babbler was moved from the monotypic genus Phyllanthus to Turdoides based on the results of a molecular phylogenetic study published in 2018.

References

Collar, N. J. & Robson, C. 2007. Family Timaliidae (Babblers)  pp. 70 – 291 in; del Hoyo, J., Elliott, A. & Christie, D.A. eds. Handbook of the Birds of the World, Vol. 12. Picathartes to Tits and Chickadees. Lynx Edicions, Barcelona.

Capuchin babbler
Birds of Sub-Saharan Africa
Capuchin babbler
Taxobox binomials not recognized by IUCN